Bernard Cleary (May 8, 1937 – July 27, 2020) was a Canadian politician.

Cleary was first elected to the House of Commons of Canada in the 2004 Canadian federal election. He was the Bloc Québécois member of parliament for the riding of Louis-Saint-Laurent. He was the Bloc's critic to the Minister of Indian Affairs and Northern Development. Prior to being elected, Cleary was a businessman, chief negotiator, journalist and professor.

In 2006, he was defeated by Josée Verner from the Conservative Party of Canada.

Cleary was born in Mashteuiatsh, Quebec. He was the first person of Aboriginal descent to be elected in Quebec, as well as the first Innu person elected from any province, to the House of Commons.

References

External links
 
How'd They Vote?: Bernard Cleary's voting history and quotes

1937 births
2020 deaths
21st-century Canadian politicians
21st-century First Nations people
Bloc Québécois MPs
First Nations politicians
Indigenous Members of the House of Commons of Canada
Innu people
Members of the House of Commons of Canada from Quebec